Karen Schmeer (February 20, 1970 – January 29, 2010) was a film editor who frequently collaborated with filmmaker Errol Morris.

Early life and education
Schmeer was born in Portland, Oregon. She was the daughter of Michael Schmeer and Eleanor DuBois, as well as the granddaughter of photographer Ray Atkeson. 

In 1988, Schmeer graduated from Portland's Lincoln High School. In 1992 she graduated from Boston University with a degree in anthropology.

Career
The year she graduated from college she was hired for an unpaid internship with Errol Morris. Schmeer edited a number of his films, including The Fog of War, a 2004 portrait of Robert S. McNamara that was nominated for an Eddie award and Fast, Cheap and Out of Control. She also edited Sergio, a 2009 film by Greg Barker about Sergio Vieira de Mello. Schmeer won the award for best documentary film editing at the 2009 Sundance Film Festival for Sergio. Other work included editing Sydney Pollack's 2005 documentary, Sketches of Frank Gehry.

Death 
Schmeer was killed on the evening of January 29, 2010, in a hit-and-run as she was crossing New York City's Broadway Street at 90th Street. The car that struck her was the getaway car for the robbery of a nearby pharmacy.

Posthumous tributes 
The Karen Schmeer Award for Excellence in Documentary Editing is awarded by the Independent Film Festival Boston.

The Karen Schmeer Film Editing Fellowship, created in 2010, is awarded annually.

Awards 
 2002: Slamdance Film Festival, Excellence in Editing Award for My Father, the Genius 
 2004: American Cinema Editors, Eddie Award, Best Edited Documentary Film (nominee) for The Fog of War: Eleven Lessons from the Life of Robert S. McNamara with Doug Abel and Chyld King
 2009: Sundance Film Festival, Editing Award, Documentary for Sergio

Filmography 
 1997: Fast, Cheap & Out of Control
 1999: Mr. Death: The Rise and Fall of Fred A. Leuchter, Jr.
 1999: Theme: Murder
 2000: Well-Founded Fear 
 2000: First Person (TV Series documentary) – episode: "The Killer Inside Me"
 2002: My Father, the Genius 
 2002: American Experience (TV Series documentary) – episode: "A Brilliant Madness"
 2003: The Same River Twice 
 2003: The Fog of War: Eleven Lessons from the Life of Robert S. McNamara 
 2005: American Masters (TV Series documentary) – episode: "Sketches of Frank Gehry"
 2006: Independent Lens (TV Series documentary) – episode: "Revolution: Five Visions"
 2008: American Son
 2008: Standard Operating Procedure – as co-editor 
 2009: Sergio
 2011: Bobby Fischer Against the World 
 2012: Futures Past

References

External links
 
 

1970 births
2010 deaths
Boston University College of Arts and Sciences alumni
Pedestrian road incident deaths
Artists from Portland, Oregon
Road incident deaths in New York City
American film editors